Sydney Swifts were an Australian netball team based in Sydney. Between 1997 and 2007, they represented Netball New South Wales in the Commonwealth Bank Trophy league. Together with Sydney Sandpipers and Hunter Jaegers, they were one of three teams to represent  NNSW in the competition. After Melbourne Phoenix, Swifts were the league's second most successful team, winning four premierships and three minor premierships. In 2008, when the Commonwealth Bank Trophy was replaced by the ANZ Championship, Swifts and Jaegers merged to form New South Wales Swifts.

History

Mobil Superleague
Sydney Swifts evolved from a state league team that represented the Ku-ring-gai area. Between 1994 and 1996, Sydney Ku-ring-gai represented New South Wales in the Mobil Superleague. They were also known as Sydney Cenovis because they were sponsored by Cenovis. The team featured a young Liz Ellis and Catherine Cox and were coached by Julie Fitzgerald. In 1994 and 1996 they were Mobil Superleague semi-finalists.

Commonwealth Bank Trophy
Between 1997 and 2007, Sydney Swifts played in the Commonwealth Bank Trophy league.
Together with Adelaide Ravens, Adelaide Thunderbirds, Melbourne Kestrels, Melbourne Phoenix, Perth Orioles, Queensland Firebirds and Sydney Sandpipers, Swifts were one of the founding members of the league. Together with Sydney Sandpipers and Hunter Jaegers, they were one of three teams to represent Netball New South Wales in the competition. After Melbourne Phoenix, Swifts were the league's second most successful team, winning four premierships in 2001, 2004, 2006 and 2007. Between 2004 and 2006, they also won three successive minor premierships. Swifts head coach throughout the Commonwealth Bank Trophy era was Julie Fitzgerald. Their leading players included Liz Ellis, Alison Broadbent, Catherine Cox, Megan Anderson and Selina Gilsenan. In 2008, when the Commonwealth Bank Trophy was replaced by the ANZ Championship, Swifts and Jaegers merged to form New South Wales Swifts.

Regular season statistics

Grand finals

Home venues

Notable former players

Internationals

 Vanessa Ware
 Amorette Wild

 Chelsea Pitman

Award winners
Most Valuable Player

Grand final MVP

Best New Talent

Captains

Most Appearances

Head coaches

Sponsorship

Premierships
Commonwealth Bank Trophy
Winners: 2001, 2004, 2006, 2007: 4
Runners up: 1998, 2003, 2005: 3
Minor premierships: 2004, 2005, 2006: 3

References

 
New South Wales Swifts
Defunct netball teams in Australia
Commonwealth Bank Trophy teams
Netball teams in Sydney
Sports clubs established in 1996
1996 establishments in Australia
2007 disestablishments in Australia
Sports clubs disestablished in 2007